Nephelium is a genus of about 25 species of flowering plants in the family Sapindaceae, native to southeastern Asia.

They are evergreen trees with pinnately compound leaves, and edible drupaceous fruit; one species, N. lappaceum (rambutan) is commercially important for its fruit. The genus is closely related to Litchi and Dimocarpus.

Selected species

References

External links
Sorting Nephelium names
e-Floras search results for Nephelium

 
Sapindaceae genera